Ammopelmatus muwu is a species of insect in family Stenopelmatidae. It is endemic to the United States.

References

Stenopelmatoidea
Orthoptera of North America
Insects of the United States
Taxonomy articles created by Polbot
Insects described in 1981